Drew Van Acker (born April 2, 1986) is an American actor, model and producer. He is known for playing Jason DiLaurentis, the older brother of Alison DiLaurentis (Sasha Pieterse), on Freeform's Pretty Little Liars (2010–2017) and Ian Archer in Cartoon Network's Tower Prep (2010). He has also starred as Remi Delatour on Lifetime's Devious Maids (2013–2015), and as Detective Tommy Campbell on the 2017 CBS police drama Training Day.

Early life
Van Acker was born in New York, but lived in Medford, New Jersey his entire life. He attended Shawnee High School, where he began acting in their high school drama classes, where he also played on his school's soccer and lacrosse teams. His soccer abilities led him to receive a soccer scholarship to Towson University in Maryland. While attending Towson, Van Acker took a number of theater courses in order to refocus on acting. He then made the decision to move to New York City, followed by a move to Los Angeles.

Career
Van Acker's acting credits include Castle and ABC Family's Greek as well co-starring in the TheWB.com series The Lake.

In 2010, Van Acker starred in the short-lived Cartoon Network live-action series Tower Prep. In June 2011, it was announced he had joined the cast of Pretty Little Liars as Jason DiLaurentis for the second season. Van Acker next appeared on Lifetime's Devious Maids as Remi Delatour. In 2017, he joined the CBS police drama Training Day as Detective Tommy Campbell. In 2019, Van Acker appeared as Garth/Aqualad in the DC Universe series Titans.

Filmography

Film

Television

Web

Music videos

References

External links
 
 

1986 births
21st-century American male actors
Male actors from New Jersey
Male actors from Philadelphia
American male film actors
American male television actors
Living people
People from Medford, New Jersey
Shawnee High School (New Jersey) alumni
Towson University alumni